Pohatcong Creek (also called the Pohatcong River) is a  tributary of the Delaware River in northwestern New Jersey in the United States.

It rises in the mountains of eastern Warren County, west of Hackettstown. It flows southwest, in a valley along the northwestern side of the Pohatcong Mountain ridge, which separates its watershed from that of the Musconetcong River. It joins the Delaware in Pohatcong Township, approximately 5 miles (8 kilometers) south of Phillipsburg.

The name Pohatcong is said to have thought of a Munsee phrase — pohwihtukwung, or "at the rippling or lapping river".

See also
 List of New Jersey rivers

References

External links
 Pohatcong Creek Watershed Association

Tributaries of the Delaware River
Rivers of New Jersey
Rivers of Warren County, New Jersey